Bullet Proof is a 1920 American silent Western film directed by Lynn Reynolds and starring Harry Carey. It is not known whether the film currently survives, and it may be a lost film.

Plot

As described in a film publication, to avenge his father's death Pierre Winton (Carey) turns outlaw and joins a band of bandits headed by Jim Boone (MacDonald). McGuirk (McKim), a lone bandit, is the object of his search and war is declared between the lone rider and Boone's band. Pierre goes to a masquerade ball one night and returns to find every member of Boone's band dead except for Jim's daughter Jackie (Burnham). Pierre gets on his horse to ride his enemy down to earth and see that vengeance is executed.

Cast
 Harry Carey as Pierre Winton
 William Ryno as Father Victor
 Fred Gamble as Father Jacques
 Kathleen O'Connor as Mary Brown
 J. Farrell MacDonald as Jim Boone
 Beatrice Burnham as Jackie Boone
 Robert McKenzie as Dick Wilbur (credited as Bob McKenzie)
 Joe Harris as Bandit
 C.E. Anderson as Bandit (credited as Captain Anderson)
 Charles Le Moyne as Bandit
 Robert McKim as McGuirk

See also
 List of American films of 1920
 Harry Carey filmography

References

External links

 

1920 films
1920 Western (genre) films
1920 lost films
American black-and-white films
Films directed by Lynn Reynolds
Universal Pictures films
Lost Western (genre) films
Silent American Western (genre) films
1920s American films
1920s English-language films